Daniel Otter is a Canadian professional boxing promoter with Three Lions Promotions, based in Ontario, Canada. Since 2016, the boxing events are held across Canada. On October 21, 2021, Three Lions co-promoted the first WBC World Bridgerweight title in Montreal, which was broadcast world wide on ESPN. 

In May 2022, Otter and his company promoted the WBC Cruiserweight International title in which Ryan Rozicki won by a split decision against undefeated former Olympian Yamil Peralta of Argentina. The bout drew criticism from the boxing world for the controversial decision.  The WBC International title was declared vacant within 24 hours and the decision nullified.

References

Living people
Boxing promoters
Year of birth missing (living people)